David Grisenthwaite from Kirkcaldy, Fife, Scotland, United Kingdom, is an amateur phenological data recorder. Since 1984 he has meticulously recorded the dates he has mowed his lawn. When his data was discovered by meteorologists it was hailed as an important find in recording climate change. Mr Grisenthwaite's first cut of the year was 13 days earlier in 2004 than in 1984, while his last cut was 17 days later, thus providing evidence for an earlier onset of spring and a warmer climate in general. He has been featured in several newspaper articles, touted as a "Great British eccentric."

David Grisenthwaite's work was credited in an article for Weather, the Royal Meteorological Society journal, entitled "The Grass is Greener – For Longer."

References

People from Kirkcaldy
Living people
Year of birth missing (living people)